George Tranter may refer to:

George Tranter (footballer, born 1886), England football player
George Tranter (footballer, born 1915), England football player